The Cape is an American dramatic TV series, with elements of science fiction, action/adventure, and drama, that was produced for syndication during the 1996–97 television season. The Cape told the story of select members of the NASA Astronaut Corps at the Kennedy Space Center in Florida with a focus on their personal lives as they train for, and execute, Space Shuttle missions. The series stars Corbin Bernsen as USAF Colonel Henry J. "Bull" Eckert, an experienced astronaut who, early in the series, was the Director of Astronaut Training but later in the series was also tasked with the responsibility of Chief of the Astronaut Office.

The series focused on authenticity and was filmed in and around Cape Canaveral, Florida.  Former astronaut Buzz Aldrin also served as technical consultant.

Cast
Corbin Bernsen as Col. Henry J. "Bull" Eckert
Adam Baldwin as Col. Jack Riles
Cameron Bancroft as Capt. Zeke Beaumont
Tyra Ferrell as Tamara St. James
Bobby Hosea as Maj. Reggie Warren
Katie Mitchell as Chief PAO Andrea Miller (called Andrea Wyler in the pilot episode)
Bobbie Phillips as Lt. Commander Barbara DeSantos 
Chad Willett as Peter Engel 
David Kelsey as D.B. Woods

Episodes

Awards
Composers John Debney and Louis Febre won Emmy Awards for their music on The Cape in 1997.  The series was also nominated in the Outstanding Sound Editing For A Series and Outstanding Main Title Music for a series in 1997.

References

External links
 

1996 American television series debuts
1997 American television series endings
1990s American drama television series
1990s American science fiction television series
Television series about NASA
Television series by 20th Century Fox Television
First-run syndicated television programs in the United States
Space adventure television series
Television series by MTM Enterprises